Héctor Medrano Abad (born March 29, 1967) is a Mexican football manager and former player.

Career
Medrano was born in Uruapan, Michoacán. He played for Correcaminos UAT, Atlas, Puebla F.C., Deportivo Toluca and Club Celaya.

He managed Querétaro to return to Primera División de México in a two-leg aggregate to try to earn promotion to Primera División after defeating Mérida F.C. in penalty series 5–4. He continued to lead the club in the Primera during the Apertura 2009 tournament.

Honours
 Primera División A: Apertura 2008
 Primera División A Campeón de Ascenso: 2008–09

References

External links

1967 births
Living people
People from Uruapan
Footballers from Michoacán
Mexican footballers
Association football defenders
Liga MX players
Correcaminos UAT footballers
Deportivo Toluca F.C. players
Atlas F.C. footballers
Club Puebla players
Mexican football managers
Querétaro F.C. managers